Trabzonspor Kulübü is a Turkish sports club located in the city of Trabzon. Formed in 1967 through a merger of several local clubs, the men's football team has won seven Süper Lig championships. Trabzonspor also have a women's football team, and used to have a men's basketball team.

Trabzonspor are one of the most decorated clubs in Turkey. They have won seven Süper Lig titles and were the first non  Istanbul-based club to win the league. They also have won nine Federation Cup (Turkish Cup) titles. The club won their first championship title in 1975–76, and won three championship titles in a row in the 1978–79, 1979–80 and 1980–81. They would add one more title in 1983-84 before embarking on a 38 year championship drought. This drought eventually came to an end after they secured the championship in 2021-22.

The club colours are claret and sky blue, reflected in the shirt colours that see various striped iterations of the colours. Trabzonspor play at the Şenol Güneş Sports Complex which replaced the Hüseyin Avni Aker Stadium as their home ground during the 2016–17 season.

History

In 1921 Trabzon İdman Ocağı were founded. Trabzonspor were founded through a merger of several local clubs including İdman Ocağı in 1967.

The club has won the Turkish league on seven occasions in 1975–76, 1976–77, 1978–79, 1979–80, 1980–81, 1983–84 and 2021–22.

In the 2010–11 season Trabzonspor finished runners-up to Fenerbahçe having achieved the same number of  points, although Fenerbahçe won the title on goal difference. After the title was given to Fenerbahçe, in the summer of 2011, the season became the subject of a match fixing scandal. On 25 June 2013, UEFA banned Fenerbahçe and Beşiktaş from European competitions over match-fixing. However, in 2021, all legal charges were dropped against Fenerbahçe in the later stages of the prosecutions.

Crest and colours
Trabzonspor uses the team logo, which has the abbreviation of its name, composed of the letter "TS" in blue with a combined font on a burgundy background.

Although a number of theories have been put forward as to why the club colours of Trabzonspor are claret and blue, it has been claimed that they were adopted after the club were sent a set of kits by the English club Aston Villa after their formation in 1967.

Stadium

Since December 2016, their home ground is the Şenol Güneş Sports Complex, which has a capacity of 40,782. Prior to this, Trabzonspor played their home matches at the Hüseyin Avni Aker Stadium, which has a capacity of 24,169.

Honours
:
 Süper Lig
Champions (7): 1975–76, 1976–77, 1978–79, 1979–80, 1980–81, 1983–84, 2021–22
 Runners-up (9): 1977–78, 1981–82, 1982–83, 1994–95, 1995–96, 2003–04, 2004–05, 2010–11, 2019–20
 Turkish Cup
 Winners (9): 1976–77, 1977–78, 1983–84, 1991–92, 1994–95, 2002–03, 2003–04, 2009–10,  2019–20
 Runners-up (6): 1974–75, 1975–76, 1984–85, 1989–90, 1996–97, 2012–13
 Turkish Super Cup
 Winners (10): 1976, 1977, 1978, 1979, 1980, 1983, 1995, 2010, 2020, 2022
 Runners-up: 1981, 1984, 1992
Prime Minister's Cup
Winners (5): 1976, 1978, 1985, 1994, 1996
Runners-up (6): 1975, 1990, 1991, 1993, 1997, 1998
Cyprus Peace Cup
Winners (1): 1975
Uhrencup
Winners (1): 2005

Statistics

European competitions record

Trabzonspor first competed in Europe in the 1976–77 season, and reached the group stages of the Champions League in the 2011–12 season.

Players

Current squad

Out on loan

Affiliated clubs

Trabzonspor U21

Trabzonspor U21 is a youth team of Trabzonspor. The club competes in the U21 league, alongside other U21 clubs around Turkey. Notable former players include Hami Mandıralı (highest capped Trabzonspor player (558 times)), Gökdeniz Karadeniz (most caps for the Turkish national team by a Trabzonspor player (50)), Fatih Tekke (2004–05 Süper Lig top scorer (31 goals)),

Trabzonspor Women

Trabzonspor Kulübü Kadın Futbol Takımı are a Turkish women's association football club affiliated with Trabzonspor. The club was founded in 2007 and they are title holders of 2008–09 season of Turkish Women's Football Super League.

1461 Trabzon

1461 Trabzon was founded as Trabzon Karadenizspor in 2008 as a feederclub in which Trabzonspor holds first buying option on players as well as being able to loan out youngsters to gain first-team experience.

Club Officials

Coaches

Presidents

Kit suppliers and shirt sponsors

Notes
<div style="font-size: 100%;">
TB  For information about amateur leagues in Turkey, see this.
Lig  Before 2001, the top-flight was known as the 1.Lig. After 2001 the 1.Lig became the second division, and the 2.Lig became the third division.

References

External links 

Official website
Trabzonspor on TFF.org
Squad, results and fixtures at UEFA

 
Sport in Trabzon
Football clubs in Turkey
Association football clubs established in 1967
1967 establishments in Turkey
Süper Lig clubs